Korea has traditionally been divided into a number of unofficial regions that reflect historical, geographical, and dialect boundaries within the Peninsula. Many of the names in the list below overlap or are obsolete today, with Honam, Yeongdong, Yeongnam, and the modern term Sudogwon being the only ones in wide use.

The names of Korea's traditional Eight Provinces are often also used as regional monikers.

List of eight regions

Extra regions

See also
 Eight Provinces of Korea
 Korean dialects
 Provinces of Korea
 Yanbian Korean Autonomous Prefecture in China